The Japanese addressing system is used to identify a specific location in Japan. When written in Japanese characters, addresses start with the largest geographical entity and proceed to the most specific one.  When written in Latin characters, addresses follow the convention used by most Western addresses and start with the smallest geographic entity (typically a house number) and proceed to the largest. The Japanese system is complex and idiosyncratic, the product of the natural growth of urban areas, as opposed to the systems used in cities that are laid out as grids and divided into quadrants or districts.

Address parts

Japanese addresses begin with the largest division of the country, the prefecture. Most of these are called ken (県), but there are also three other special prefecture designations: to (都) for Tokyo, dō (道) for Hokkaidō and fu (府) for the two urban prefectures of Osaka and Kyoto.

Following the prefecture is the municipality. For a large municipality this is the city (shi, 市). For smaller municipalities, the address includes the district (gun, 郡) followed by the town (chō or machi, 町) or village (mura or son, 村). In Japan, a city is separate from districts, which contain towns and villages.

For addressing purposes, municipalities may be divided into chō or machi (two different readings of the character 町,  depending on the particular case) and/or aza (字).  Despite using the same character as town, the machi here is purely a unit of address, not administration; likewise, there are also ku address divisions that are not administrative special wards.  There are two common schemes:

 Municipality is divided first into machi and then into city districts (丁目 chōme).  Example: 台東区[浅草四丁目] (Taito-ku, [Asakusa, 4-chōme])
 Municipality is divided into ō-aza (大字), which may be divided into aza (字), which may in turn be divided into ko-aza (小字).  Example: 青森市[大字滝沢字住吉] (Aomori-shi, [ō-aza Takizawa, aza Sumiyoshi])

However, exceptions abound, and the line between the schemes is often blurry as there are no clear delimiters for machi, aza, etc.  There are also some municipalities like Ryūgasaki, Ibaraki which do not use any subdivisions.

Below this level, two styles of addressing are possible.

Building 10 in block 5 would be formally written as 5番10号 (5-ban 10-gō). For apartment buildings, the apartment number (部屋番号 heya bangō) may be appended to the building with a hyphen, so apartment 103 in the aforementioned building would be 5番10-103号.
 In the older  style, still used in some rural and older city areas, the next level is the area/block name (地区 chiku, often abbreviated as 区 ku), the next smaller level is the lot number (番地 banchi), optionally followed by a lot number extension (formally , more often ).  The lot number designates a plot of land registered in the land registry, and a lot number extension is assigned when a piece of land is divided into two or more pieces in the registry.  This can be written as any of 3番地5 (3-banchi 5), 3番地の5 (3-banchi-no 5) or 3番5 (3-ban 5).  Land not designated by the registry is known as  mubanchi , with any dwellings there being bangaichi .

In both styles, since all address elements from chōme down are numeric, in casual use it is common to form them into a string separated by hyphens or the possessive suffix の (no),  resulting in Asakusa 4-5-10 or Asakusa 4の5の10.  This renders the two styles indistinguishable, but since each municipality adopts one style or the other, there is no risk of ambiguity.  The apartment number may also be appended, resulting in 4-5-10-103.

Street names are seldom used in postal addresses (except in Kyoto and some Hokkaidō cities such as Sapporo).

Banchi blocks often have an irregular shape, as banchi numbers were assigned by order of registration in the older system, meaning that especially in older areas of the city they will not run in a linear order.  For this reason, when giving directions to a location, people will often offer cross streets, visual landmarks and subway stations, such as "at Chūō-dori and Matsuya-dori across the street from Matsuya and Ginza station" for a store in Tokyo. Many businesses feature maps on their literature and business cards. Signs attached to utility poles often specify the city district name and block number, and detailed block maps of the immediate area are sometimes posted near bus stops and train station exits in larger cities.

In addition to the address itself, all locations in Japan have a postal code.  After the reform of 1998, this begins with a three-digit number, a hyphen, and a four-digit number, for example 123-4567. A postal mark, 〒, may precede the code to indicate that the number following is a postal code.

Address order
In Japanese, the address is written in order from largest unit to smallest, with the addressee's name last of all.  For example, the address of the Tokyo Central Post Office is

〒100-8994  東京都千代田区丸ノ内二丁目7番2号  東京中央郵便局

〒100-8994 Tōkyō-to Chiyoda-ku Marunouchi 2-Chōme 7-ban 2-gō  Tōkyō Chūō Yūbin-kyoku

or

〒100-8994  東京都千代田区丸ノ内2-7-2  東京中央郵便局

〒100-8994  Tōkyō-to Chiyoda-ku Marunouchi 2-7-2  Tōkyō Chūō Yūbin-kyoku

The order is reversed when writing in romaji.  The format recommended by Japan Post is:

Tokyo Central Post Office7-2, Marunouchi 2-ChomeChiyoda-ku, Tokyo 100-8994

In this address, Tokyo is the prefecture; Chiyoda-ku is one of the special wards; Marunouchi 2-Chome is the name of the city district; and 7-2 is the city block and building number. In practice it is common for the chōme to be prefixed, as in Japanese, resulting in the somewhat shorter:

Tokyo Central Post Office2-7-2 Marunouchi, Chiyoda-kuTokyo 100-8994

While almost all elements of the address are reversed when written in Rōmaji, connected strings of numbers are treated as units and not reversed. Firstly, the "city block and building number" is a unit, and its digits are not reversed – in this example it is "7-2" in both Japanese and roman, though the Japanese (literally Marunouchi 2-Chōme 7-2) is partly reversed to "7-2, Marunouchi 2-Chōme" in roman if chōme is separate. Similarly, if the chōme is included, these also form a unit, so in this example the string is 2-7-2 in both Japanese and Western alphabet.

Special cases
As mentioned above, there are certain areas of Japan that use somewhat unusual address systems. Sometimes the differing system has been incorporated into the official system, as in Sapporo, while in Kyoto the system is completely different from, but used alongside the official system. Kyoto and Sapporo have addresses based on their streets being laid out in a grid plan, unlike most Japanese cities.

Kyoto

As a result, most residents of Kyoto use an unofficial system based instead on street names, a form of vernacular geography. This system is, however, recognized by the post office and by government agencies.

For added precision, the street-based address can be given, followed by the chō and land number.

More precisely, the two streets of the intersection are not treated symmetrically: one names the street that the address is on, then gives a nearby cross street, and then specifies the address relative to the cross street. What this means is that a building can have more than one address depending on which cross street intersection is chosen.

For instance, the address of Kyoto Tower is listed on their website as:
〒600-8216
京都市下京区烏丸通七条下ル 東塩小路町 721-1
Following the postcode, this contains the city and ward, followed by the unofficial address, a space, and then the official address:
京都市下京区 Kyōto-shi, Shimogyō-ku
烏丸七条下ル Karasuma-Shichijō-sagaru
東塩小路町 721-1 Higashi-Shiokōji 721-1

This address means "south of the intersection of Karasuma and Shichijō streets" – more precisely, "on Karasuma, below (south of) Shichijō" (Karasuma runs north-south, while Shichijō is an east-west cross street). The street address may alternatively be given as 烏丸通七条下ル (with  inserted), indicating clearly that the address is on Karasuma street.

However, the system is flexible and allows for various alternatives, such as:
京都府京都市下京区烏丸塩小路上ル
Kyōto-fu, Kyōto-shi, Shimogyō-ku, Karasuma-Shiokōji-agaru
"(On) Karasuma (street), above (north of) Shiokōji (street)"

For less well known buildings, the official address is often given after the informal one, as in the address for the Shinatora Ramen restaurant:
京都府京都市下京区烏丸通五条下ル大坂町384
Kyōto-fu, Kyōto-shi, Shimogyō-ku, Karasuma-dōri-Gojō-sagaru, Ōsakachō 384
"Ōsakachō 384, (on) Karasuma street, below (south of) Gojō"

More informally, particularly on return addresses for in-town mail, the city and ward can be abbreviated to the initial character, with a dot or comma to indicate abbreviation – there are only 11 wards of Kyoto, so this is easily understood. For example, 京都市 Kyōto-shi is abbreviated to 京、 Kyō– and 下京区 Shimogyō-ku is abbreviated to 下、Shimo–. Combining these (and dropping okurigana), one may abbreviate the address of Kyoto Tower to:
〒600-8216
京、下、烏丸七条下
Karasuma-Shichijō-sagaru, Shimo–, Kyō–, 600-8216

Sapporo
Sapporo's system, though official, differs in structure from regular Japanese addresses. The city-center is divided into quadrants by two intersecting roads, Kita-Ichijo and Soseigawa; blocks are then named based on their distance from this point, and farther from the city center, multiple blocks are included in each. The east–west distance is indicated by chōme (a slightly unorthodox usage of chōme), while the north–south distance is indicated by jō, which has been incorporated into the chō name.

The address to Sapporo JR Tower is:

札幌市中央区北5条西2丁目5番地
Sapporo-shi, Chūō-ku, kita-5-jō-nishi 2-chōme 5-banchi

This address indicates that it is the fifth building on a block located on 5 jō north and 2 chōme west of the center, named with the actual cardinal names of kita (north), minami (south), nishi (west), and higashi (east). The directional names for jō extend for about 7 kilometers to the north/south along the main Soseigawa Dori, but only about 3 kilometers at the most to the east and west; outside of that area, jō have other names, though the starting point of each is still the corner in the direction of the city center, often using landmarks such as the Hakodate Main Line or large roads to mark the new numbering.

For example, far in the outskirts is the Sapporo Tachibana Hospital, at:

〒006-0841　札幌市手稲区曙11条2丁目3番12号
Sapporo-shi, Teine-ku, Akebono-11-jō, 2-chōme-3-ban-12-gō

Building 12 on block 3 of a chōme measuring 11 jō north and 2 chōme west of where the Hakodate Main Line meets Tarukawa Street. Or Toyohira Ward office, at:

〒062-0934 札幌市豊平区平岸6条10丁目1-1
Sapporo, Toyohira-ku, Hiragishi-6-jō, 10-chōme-1-ban-1-gō

Building 1 on block 1 of a chōme measuring 6 jō south and 10 chōme east of where a small street meets the Toyohira River. The direction is understood based on the quadrant of the city the jō is considered to be in, which may be off from the actual direction to the city center, depending on the landmark used.

Far-flung and less crowded parts of the city may instead use a standard chō name, rather than a numbered jō, such as Makomanai.

Ōita
While outwardly similar, these addresses end in kumi (組) or ku (区):

大分県大分市羽屋4-1-A組
Haneya 4-1-A-kumi, Ōita-shi, Ōita-ken

大分県臼杵市臼杵洲崎四丁目1組
Suzaki 4-chōme 1-kumi, Usuki-shi, Ōita-ken

As the names indicate, these derive from traditional neighbourhood councils. While they continue to be used locally (e.g. school and electoral districts) and may be accepted for mail delivery, they are not considered official addresses, and individual buildings in each kumi will also have a standard ōaza-banchi address.

〒875-8501
大分県臼杵市大字臼杵72-1
Ōaza Usuki 72-1, Usuki-shi, Ōita-ken 875-8501

Katakana blocks (bu)
Some cities in Ishikawa Prefecture, including Kanazawa and Nanao, sometimes use katakana in the iroha ordering (イ・ロ・ハ・ニ ... ) instead of numbers for blocks. These are called bu (部).  For example, the address of the Kagaya Hotel in Nanao is:

〒926-0192石川県七尾市和倉町ヨ80
Wakuramachi yo 80, Nanao-shi, Ishikawa-ken 926-0192

Jikkan instead of numbered chōme
Some cities, including parts of Nagaoka, Niigata, use jikkan (甲・乙・丙 ... ) prefixed to the block number to indicate traditional divisions.  These function similarly to chōme and are treated as such in addresses.  For example, Yoita police station in Nagaoka has the address:

〒940-2402
Yoita-otsu 5881-3, Yoita-machi, Nagaoka-shi, Niigata-ken 940-2402

History 
The current addressing system was established after World War II as a slight modification of the scheme used since the Meiji era.

For historical reasons, names quite frequently conflict.  It is typical in Hokkaidō where many place names are identical to those found in the rest of Japan, for example Shin-Hiroshima (literary new Hiroshima) to Hiroshima, largely as the result of the systematic group emigration projects since the late 19th century to Hokkaidō; people from villages across mainland Japan dreamt to become wealthy farmers. Historians note that there is also a significant similarity between place names in Kansai region and those in northern Kyūshū. See Japanese place names for more.

Named roads
Named roads  are roads or sections deemed noteworthy and given a name. Unlike in other nations, named roads are not used in addresses but merely for logistic purposes; excepting in the above mentioned Kyoto system.

Gallery

See also
House numbering

References

External links
 The Japanese address system
 Postal Information for Japan, japan-guide.com
 Japanese 2005 census - definition of shi,ku, &c.
 Japan addressing , Universal Postal Union

Communications in Japan
Postal system of Japan
Government of Japan
Japan